Glyn Conrad Davis AC (born 25 July 1959) is an Australian academic who is the Secretary of the Department of Prime Minister and Cabinet, appointed by Prime Minister Anthony Albanese on 30 May 2022, and commenced on 6 June 2022.

Davis was previously a Distinguished Professor at the Australian National University's Crawford School of Public Policy. From January 2005 until September 2018, he served as the Vice-Chancellor of the University of Melbourne.

Personal life
Davis was educated at Marist Brothers College, Kogarah.  He later studied political science at the University of New South Wales and the Australian National University where he completed a doctoral thesis on the political independence of the Australian Broadcasting Corporation, before undertaking post-doctoral appointments as a Harkness Fellow at the University of California, Berkeley, the Brookings Institution in Washington DC and the John F. Kennedy School of Government at Harvard University.

Davis is married to Margaret Gardner, the Vice-Chancellor of Monash University. When Davis was Vice-Chancellor of the University of Melbourne, he and his spouse were regularly referred to as "Melbourne's top academic couple".

Career
For nearly 14 years Davis served as Vice-Chancellor and Principal of the University of Melbourne and as Professor of Political Science in the Faculty of Arts. He publishes on public policy.

Davis began his academic career at Griffith University. He commenced as a lecturer in public policy in 1985 and was appointed as a professor in 1998. He has combined an academic career with practical experience in government, serving as Commissioner for Public Sector Equity with the Public Sector Management Commission from 1990 to 1993, as Director-General of the Office of the Cabinet from 1995 to 1996 under Premier Wayne Goss, and as Director-General of the Department of the Premier and Cabinet to the Premier of Queensland, Peter Beattie, from 1998 to 2002.

Davis became Vice-Chancellor and President of Griffith University in 2002. In January 2005 he was appointed Vice-Chancellor of the University of Melbourne and has led the introduction of the university's "Melbourne Curriculum" academic structure.

In 2008, Davis co-chaired the Australia 2020 Summit and, in the same year, served as a member of the Innovation Taskforce, an expert group commissioned to review Australia's research and innovation systems.

Internationally, Davis is an immediate past chair of Universitas 21, a grouping of 24 leading universities from around the globe, a member of the Association of Pacific Rim Universities, a member of the Hong Kong Grants Commission until 31 December 2010 and a director of the Menzies Centre for Australian Studies at King's College London.

Davis is the patron of Australia 21, a non-profit organisation developing research networks on key issues affecting Australia's future. He is a former president of the Group of Eight, a group representing a number of Australia's major research universities. Previously, he was the foundation chairman of the Australia and New Zealand School of Government (ANZSOG), which is headquartered at the University of Melbourne.

Davis was selected by the Australian Broadcasting Corporation to present the 51st Boyer Lectures series, on-air from 14 November 2010, with the topic of "The Republic of Learning: higher education transforms Australia".

In October 2018, Davis joined the Crawford School of Public Policy at the Australian National University as a distinguished professor. He is also a visiting professor at the Policy Institute, King's College London, visiting professor in the Blavatnik School of Government at Oxford, and in 2018 was elected a visiting fellow at Exeter College Oxford. Davis is also an honorary professor of public policy at Manchester University.

In December 2018, Davis became the CEO of the Paul Ramsay Foundation.

In June 2022, Davis became the Secretary of the Department of the Prime Minister and Cabinet.

Honours
Davis is a Fellow of the Academy of Social Sciences in Australia and the Institute of Public Administration Australia, received the Centenary Medal "in recognition of contribution to public service" and, on 26 January 2002, became a Companion of the Order of Australia for his "service to public administration, particularly as an advocate for good governance, constitutional reform and the creation of infrastructure to enable the development of a "knowledge-based" nation, to tertiary education in the field of political science, and to the community." He holds honorary doctorates from Griffith University and the University of New South Wales. There are buildings named after him on the campus of Griffith University at Nathan, and the Melbourne School of Design at the University of Melbourne Parkville. In September 2018 Davis was awarded the lifetime achievement award in higher education by the Australian Financial Review.

Publications
Davis has written widely on policy and governance. His most recent publications are:
 On Life's Lottery, Hachette, 2021.
The Australian Idea of a University, Melbourne University Publishing, 2017.
 The Australian Policy Handbook (6th edition with Peter Bridgman and Catherine Althaus), Routledge, 2017.
 The Future of Australian Governance (co-editor with Michael Keating), St Leonards, NSW: Allen & Unwin, 2000. 
 Are You Being Served? State, Citizens and Governance (co-editor with Patrick Weller), Crows Nest, NSW: Allen & Unwin, 2001.
 The Republic of Learning: higher education transforms Australia, Australian Broadcasting Corporation (Boyer Lectures), 2010.
 'Universities in the Service of the Nation' in Melbourne University Law Review (2015) Volume 38(3)  special issue in memory of Sir Zelman Cowen Current Issue

References

External links
 University of Melbourne

 

1959 births
Living people
Vice-Chancellors of the University of Melbourne
People from Sydney
Australian National University alumni
University of New South Wales alumni
Companions of the Order of Australia
Recipients of the Centenary Medal
Fellows of the Academy of the Social Sciences in Australia
Harkness Fellows